Tonggwangryang station, or East Kwangryang station is a railway station in Porim-rodongjagu, Onch'ŏn-gun, Namp'o Special City, North Korea on the P'yŏngnam Line of the Korean State Railway.

History

References

Railway stations in North Korea
Railway stations opened in 1938
Buildings and structures in Nampo
1938 establishments in Korea